Paris Première is a French TV channel, available on cable, satellite and the digital terrestrial service, Télévision Numérique Terrestre. It was launched on 15 December 1986 and is now wholly owned by the Groupe M6.

Programming

Talk show 
Ca balance à Paris !, talk show
Zemmour & Naulleau, satirical talk
Les Grosses Têtes, comedy talk
Paris direct, news talk

Magazines 
Intérieurs, homestyle show
La Mode, la mode, la mode, fashion show
Très Très Bon !, culinary show
Arabelle, art show

Reality show 
Le Monde des records, entertainment
Cauchemar en cuisine, US version of Kitchen Nightmares
Hôtel Hell, US version of Hotel Hell
 Matilda and the Ramsay Bunch - UK series

Series 
 Boardwalk Empire
 Modern Family
 Caméra Café
 Lie to Me
 My Name Is Earl
 Blue Bloods
 Supernatural
 The L.A. Complex
 The Killing
 Silk Stalkings
 Sex and the City
 Kaamelott, French creation

Animated 
 Family Guy
 The Flintstones

Award 
 Tony Award

Logos

References

External links
Official Site 

Television stations in France
French-language television stations
Television channels and stations established in 1986
1986 establishments in France
RTL Group
Pay television